The Pilbara flame-tailed slider (Lerista flammicauda)  is a species of skink found in Western Australia.

References

Lerista
Reptiles described in 1985
Taxa named by Glen Milton Storr